Derek "The One Man Riot" Bryant (born April 19, 1971) is an American professional boxer.

Biography
Bryant was born in Philadelphia, Pennsylvania. He is a journeyman fighter who has appeared on the TV program Friday Night Fights. He holds wins against Jorge Luis Gonzalez, Taurus Sykes, Robert Wiggins and had a draw with Lawrence Clay Bey. He has lost fights to Eric Kirkland, Malcolm Tann, Jovo Pudar, and Ran Nakash.

Professional boxing record

|-
| align="center" style="border-style: none none solid solid; background: #e3e3e3"|Result
| align="center" style="border-style: none none solid solid; background: #e3e3e3"|Record
| align="center" style="border-style: none none solid solid; background: #e3e3e3"|Opponent
| align="center" style="border-style: none none solid solid; background: #e3e3e3"|Type
| align="center" style="border-style: none none solid solid; background: #e3e3e3"|Round
| align="center" style="border-style: none none solid solid; background: #e3e3e3"|Date
| align="center" style="border-style: none none solid solid; background: #e3e3e3"|Location
| align="center" style="border-style: none none solid solid; background: #e3e3e3"|Notes
|-align=center
|Loss
|20–7–1
|align=left| Ran Nakash
|UD
|8
|January 21, 2012
|align=left| Roseland Ballroom, New York City
|align=left|
|-
|Loss
|20–6–1
|align=left| Seth Mitchell
|TKO
|1
|July 31, 2010
|align=left| Mandalay Bay, Las Vegas, Nevada
|align=left|
|-
|Loss
|20–5–1
|align=left| Jason Estrada
|UD
|8
|November 29, 2008
|align=left| Twin River Casino, Lincoln, Rhode Island
|align=left|
|-
|Win
|20–4–1
|align=left| Joe Stofle
|TKO
|1
|January 20, 2007
|align=left| Ohio Expo Center Coliseum, Columbus, Ohio
|align=left|
|-
|Win
|19–4–1
|align=left| Taurus Sykes
|TKO
|4
|April 21, 2006
|align=left| Augusta-Richmond County Civic Center, Augusta, Georgia
|align=left|
|-
| Draw
|18–4–1
|align=left| Lawrence Clay Bey
|MD
|10
|05/08/2005
|align=left| Foxwoods, Mashantucket, Connecticut
|align=left|
|-
|Loss
|18–4
|align=left| Malcolm Tann
|UD
|8
|09/06/2005
|align=left| Pechanga Resort and Casino, Temecula, California
|align=left|
|-
|Win
|18–3
|align=left| Alex Gonzales
|TKO
|2
|May 13, 2005
|align=left| A La Carte Event Pavilion, Tampa, Florida
|align=left|
|-
|Loss
|17–3
|align=left| Robert Wiggins
|UD
|8
|June 26, 2004
|align=left| Silverton Casino Lodge, Enterprise, Nevada

|align=left|
|-
|Loss
|17–2
|align=left| Jovo Pudar
|TKO
|6
|November 22, 2003
|align=left| Caesars Tahoe, Stateline, Nevada
|align=left|
|-
|Win
|17–1
|align=left| Barry Lineberger
|SD
|6
|August 16, 2003
|align=left| Mohegan Sun, Uncasville, Connecticut
|align=left|
|-
|Loss
|16–1
|align=left| Eric Kirkland
|TKO
|9
|March 31, 2003
|align=left| Statehouse Convention Center, Little Rock, Arkansas
|align=left|
|-
|Win
|16–0
|align=left| Damon Reed
|TKO
|2
|January 25, 2003
|align=left| Pechanga Resort and Casino, Temecula, California
|align=left|
|-
|Win
|15–0
|align=left| Frankie Swindell
|TKO
|7
|September 29, 2002
|align=left| Palace Indian Gaming Center, Lemoore, California
|align=left|
|-
|Win
|14–0
|align=left| Robert Wiggins
|TKO
|4
|04/06/2002
|align=left| Morrell Park, Savannah, Georgia
|align=left|
|-
|Win
|13–0
|align=left| Lovy Page
|KO
|5
|March 29, 2002
|align=left| Paris Las Vegas, Las Vegas, Nevada
|align=left|
|-
|Win
|12–0
|align=left| Jorge Luis Gonzalez
|TKO
|1
|January 18, 2002
|align=left| Paris Las Vegas, Las Vegas, Nevada
|align=left|
|-
|Win
|11–0
|align=left| Wes Taylor
|TKO
|1
|December 14, 2001
|align=left| Pennsylvania Convention Center, Philadelphia, Pennsylvania
|align=left|
|-
|Win
|10–0
|align=left| Nicholus Nurse
|TKO
|2
|07/09/2000
|align=left| Grand Casino, Gulfport, Mississippi
|align=left|
|-
|Win
|9–0
|align=left| Clarence Goins
|KO
|2
|February 25, 2000
|align=left| Philadelphia, Pennsylvania
|align=left|
|-
|Win
|8–0
|align=left| Donald Tucker 
|TKO
|1
|November 19, 1999
|align=left| Philadelphia, Pennsylvania
|align=left|
|-
|Win
|7–0
|align=left| Jose Felipe Colon
|UD
|6
|January 21, 1999
|align=left| Marksville, Louisiana
|align=left|
|-
|Win
|6–0
|align=left| William Morris
|TKO
|4
|September 25, 1998
|align=left| Shuler Gymnasium, Philadelphia, Pennsylvania
|align=left|
|-
|Win
|5–0
|align=left| Kelvin Hale
|TKO
|1
|04/09/1998
|align=left| Trump Taj Majal, Atlantic City, New Jersey
|align=left|
|-
|Win
|4–0
|align=left| Albert Stewart
|UD
|4
|July 28, 1998
|align=left| Horseshoe Casino, Tunica, Mississippi
|align=left|
|-
|Win
|3–0
|align=left| June Thomas
|KO
|1
|March 13, 1998
|align=left| The Blue Horizon, Philadelphia, Pennsylvania
|align=left|
|-
|Win
|2–0
|align=left| Ricardo Dabney
|KO
|2
|February 13, 1998
|align=left| The Blue Horizon, Philadelphia, Pennsylvania
|align=left|
|-
|Win
|1–0
|align=left| Levay King
|TKO
|1
|January 23, 1998
|align=left| The Blue Horizon, Philadelphia, Pennsylvania
|align=left|
|}

References

External links
 

1971 births
Living people
Heavyweight boxers
Boxers from Philadelphia
American male boxers